Brigadier General Trần Quang Khôi (born January 24, 1930) was a general of the Army of the Republic of Vietnam (ARVN). He commanded the ARVN III Armor Brigade and III Corps Assault Task Force (ATF) throughout III Corps Tactical Zone and in defense of the City of Bien Hoa against the final Communist Ho Chi Minh Campaign offensive in South Vietnam.

Early life and education 
Khôi was born in Đa Phước Hội village, Mỏ Cày district, Bến Tre Province, in South Vietnam to his father Trần Quang Chiêu and mother Lê Thị Hòa. He grew up in Vĩnh Thanh Vân village, Châu Thành Rạch Giá, Kiên Giang Province.

After having arrived in the United States in May 1993 under the Humanitarian Resettlement Program (HO), part of the Orderly Departure Program (ODP), Khôi studied at the George Mason University in Virginia, majored in French Studies, and graduated with a Master of Arts degree in 1998.

Biography
Read by Senator Richard H. Black before the Senate of Virginia

On the 10th of February 2014

	BG Tran Quang Khoi is a 1952 graduate of the Vietnamese National Military Academy.  He received an MA in French Studies from George Mason University in Virginia.

	His Military education included: the French Cavalry School at Saumur in 1955 (Advanced Course), the US Army Armor School at Fort Knox in 1959 (Advanced Course), and the US Army Command and General Staff College at Fort Leavenworth in 1972-1973
	In early 1970, his combined-arms Task Force 318 spearheaded the US/VN incursion into Cambodia destroying large NVA logistical installations and damaging heavily NVA main forces.

	In November 1970, he organized, trained 3rd Armored Cavalry Brigade and commanded it in Cambodia to secure the border against NVA infiltrations into III Corps area.
	

The Paris Peace Accords signed on 27 January 1973 nominally ended the VN War but in fact, provided opportunity for North VN to take over South VN.  As the U.S. withdrew troops and cut support, the military situation grew increasingly serious.  Finally, North VN supported by the Soviet Union and Communist China used armed aggression against the Republic of South VN.

	In March 1974, NVA 5th Infantry Division surrounded DUC Hue Base defended by ARVN 83rd Ranger Battalion.  In 3 days the ARVN 3rd Cav. Brigade (+) broke the siege defeating the NVA 5th Division by a night river crossing and a surprise counterattack in Cambodia.

	During the last days if the VN War, the III Corps Assault Force (IIICAF) under BG Tran Q. Khoi command defended Bien Hoa City, defeated NVA 341st Division in its vicinity, forcing the enemy to give up the fight an withdraw with very heavy casualties.

	Then the NVA concentrated all of his forces (15 divisions) to attack Saigon.

	In the morning of 30 April 1975, the IIICAF left Bien Hoa rushed to rescue Saigon but had to stop the fighting when BG Khoi heard the President’s voice on the radio ordering all ARVN to cease fire and surrender.

	In the end, BG Khoi refused to flee the country with his C and C ship and joined his fighting men in captivity in North VN.  Only with the help of Senator John McCain did the Communists release him from concentration camps after 17 years and let him go to the U. S. to reunite with his family in Virginia in May 1993.

Military education

 Vietnamese National Military Academy in Đà Lạt, class of 1952
French Cavalry School at Saumur, France, in 1955 (Advanced Course)
 United States Army Armor School in Fort Knox, Kentucky, in 1959 (Advanced Course)
Master of Military Arts and Sciences (MMAS) degree from US Army, Command and General Staff College in Fort Leavenworth, Kansas, class of 1972-1973.

Military service

He served with the ARVN 5th Cavalry to Xuan Loc.

His combined-arms Task Force 318 spearheaded the Cambodian Campaign.

He organized and trained III Armor Brigade and commanded it in Cambodia.

Tran was captured at the end of the battle and spent 17 years in a re-education camp. In 1992, he was released and in 1993, he received political asylum from the United States.

Quotes
 I was most sorry for the outcome of the war, but I had done my best. I let my troops execute the President's final order for themselves: I had nothing more to say. But deep in my heart, I silently thanked all of them for their courage, sacrifice, and dedication until the very last minute of the war. Together, we had fulfilled our obligation and oath of allegiance. 
I shall never repent having done what I did, nor complain about the consequences of my captivity. If history were to repeat itself, I would choose the same path. By doing so, I know from experience that I would lose everything but HONOR.

References

External links
General Tran Quang Khoi biography
Brigadier General Tran Quang Khoi's biography of his unit's fight to defend South Vietnam: "Fighting to the Finish"

Army of the Republic of Vietnam generals
Living people
American people of Vietnamese descent
Vietnamese exiles
Non-U.S. alumni of the Command and General Staff College
1930 births
South Vietnamese military personnel of the Vietnam War
Vietnamese anti-communists